The 2022–23 season is the 117th season in the history of RC Strasbourg Alsace and their sixth consecutive season in the top flight. The club are participating in Ligue 1 and Coupe de France.

Players

First-team squad

Out on loan

Transfers

In

Out

Pre-season and friendlies

Competitions

Overall record

Ligue 1

League table

Results summary

Results by round

Matches 
The league fixtures were announced on 17 June 2022.

Coupe de France

References 

RC Strasbourg Alsace seasons
Strasbourg